Guzmania albescens is a species of plant in the family Bromeliaceae. It is endemic to Ecuador.  Its natural habitat is subtropical or tropical moist lowland forests. It is threatened by habitat loss.

References

Flora of Ecuador
albescens
Endangered plants
Taxonomy articles created by Polbot